The 2014 Copa do Brasil Third Round was played from 23 July to 14 August 2014 and decided the 10 teams advancing to the knockout rounds. Different than the first two rounds, in this round the away team that wins the first match by 2 or more goals do not progress straight to the next round avoiding the second leg. The order of the matches was determined by a random draw.

Third round

|}
<div id="Note 2">Note 1: Novo Hamburgo won 2–1 on aggregate but was disqualified by the STJD after being punished for fielding an ineligible player.</div>

Match 61Vasco da Gama won 4–1 on aggregate.Match 62Novo Hamburgo won 2–1 on aggregate but was disqualified by the STJD after being punished for fielding an ineligible player.Match 63Santos won 3–2 on aggregate.Match 64Palmeiras won 3–0 on aggregate.Match 65Tied 5–5 on aggregate, América de Natal won on away goals.Match 66Corinthians won 3–1 on aggregate.Match 67Santa Rita won 4–3 on aggregate.Match 68Bragantino won 4–3 on aggregate.Match 69Coritiba won 3–2 on aggregate.Match 70Ceará won 5–2 on aggregate.''

Notes

References

2014 Copa do Brasil